Toivonen is a Finnish surname.

Geographical distribution
As of 2014, 88.2% of all known bearers of the surname Toivonen were residents of Finland (frequency 1:603), 3.4% of the United States (1:1,038,078), 3.3% of Sweden (1:28,961), 1.8% of Estonia (1:7,183) and 1.4% of Australia (1:162,835).

In Finland, the frequency of the surname was higher than national average (1:603) in the following regions:
 1. Southwest Finland (1:255)
 2. Tavastia Proper (1:286)
 3. Satakunta (1:360)
 4. Pirkanmaa (1:390)
 5. Päijänne Tavastia (1:408)

People
Notable people with the surname include:

Armas Toivonen (1899–1973), Finnish marathon runner
Ester Toivonen (1914–1979), Finnish beauty pageant winner and actress
Hannu Toivonen (born 1984), Finnish ice hockey player
Harri Toivonen (born 1960), Finnish racing driver
Henri Toivonen (1956–1986), Finnish rally driver
Kalervo Toivonen (1913–2006), Finnish javelin thrower
Kari-Pekka Toivonen (born 1967), Finnish actor
Markus Toivonen (born 1979), Finnish musician
Nestori Toivonen (1865–1927), Finnish sport shooter
Ola Toivonen (born 1986), Swedish footballer
Pauli Toivonen (1929–2005), Finnish rally driver
Thomas Toivonen (born 1974), Swedish-Finnish jazz guitarist
Tuija Toivonen (born 1958), Finnish long-distance runner

References

Finnish-language surnames